Melanella algoensis is a species of sea snail, a marine gastropod mollusk in the family Eulimidae. The species is one of multiple species known to exist within the genus, Melanella.

Distribution

This species occurs in the following locations:

 Madagascar
 South Africa (country)

References

External links
 To World Register of Marine Species

algoensis
Gastropods described in 1901